Hitler's Grave, also known as Heaven's Taxi, is a film by Daryush Shokof. The film is about an Iranian girl played by Taies Farzan who leaves Iran in order to fulfill two promises she makes to her dying brother just moments before he dies. Her brother Majid, played by Afshin Akhavan, had been fatally tortured by agents from the Islamic Republic of Iran after being arrested for taking part in the protests against the 2009 Iranian presidential election. The first promise she makes to the brother is that she will go to Berlin, Germany to find Hitler's grave. The second promise is kept a secret from the audience until the last scene of the film in a masterful Hitchcockian style of suspense as Majid whispers the words into his sister's ear just before he dies. The film won best awards for Film and Directorial for Daryush Shokof at the NYIIFVF. The film features well-known German actor Vadim Glowna as a Grand Rabbi.

Plot 
The hero of the film is a Muslim woman "Atossa", played by Taies Farzan who starts the whole story based on her promises to her brother. Daryush Shokof suggested in an interview after the film that he specifically wanted to show the important role of women in Iranian society and how he admires their courage and honesty. Shokof intends to show how he feels about Iranian women and their ability to free Iranians from under the fundamentalist Islamic regime that has governed the Iranian nation for over 37 years now. Therefore his hero is a woman, and it is the woman who promises a word and keeps it, and delivers it rather than a man in an all too male and macho oriented religious society and government that he believes has brutally dictated backwards rules upon Iranians that have in his opinio taken Iranians back to the dark ages of religious fanatacism.

The hero of the film is Atossa who is the sister of the dying brother making two idealistically rare and odd and strange and hopeful promises. She sets out to travel to Berlin, Germany to first find the grave of Hitler who all believe does not exist and then to make the situation more round she continues with the second promise that remains a mystery until the final moment of the film.

Atossa is passionate, sincere, daring, powerful and a well trained fighter (we see her fighting masterfully in a training in the first moments of the film where another fighting trainee tells her about the grave situation of her brother's fate).
She encounters many unfortunate typical encounters on the streets of Berlin to finally finding the Rabbi (played by Vadim Glowna) who suggests to her a site where Hitler could be buried under.

However, he also tells her the truth about the nature of many mysteries throughout the history of mankind while explaining to her that we human being adore mysteries and there are some amongst us that are masters at creating stories and mysteries from who the prophets were to how Marilyn Monroe died and or who really killed Kennedy or whatever suddenly happened to Michael Jackson on the same eve of the day where Iranian regime was almost about to fall?!

The plot suggests many clever details and secretive and thought provoking questions about why we all somehow are victims but keeps the audience awake by simplicity of the story and how it progresses as it sticks to her pursuit of finding the solution to her second promise.

After she finds out the presumably the grave spot of Hitler, she is now overjoyed, convinced, and is positively motivated to continue her mission in order to deliver the second promise. She arrives at her hotel room to rest a while, turns on the TV screen and is shocked to see the shooting death of Neda, the innocent Iranian student during the protests on the streets of Tehran. The horrifying pictures of the final dying moments of Neda takes her by storm.

Here the film takes the daring turn to free Atossa from the grip of religion fanaticism over her life as she runs out of the hotel in a fury and runs aimlessly to mere exhaustion. There and finally she walks over the bridge where the wide calm rivers flow heavy under the bridge. There she finally takes the mandatory scarf off her head and throws it into the river as it disappears into the deep waters. Now she feels free again for once after being out of the country, and starts walking through the streets of Berlin, goes to dance alone in a club, gets drunk and is saved from being attacked by drunk wild men in the club by the hotel keeper who has a feeling for her ever since the first minute she arrived in the hotel.

She battles Nazis, beats the life out of two low life city slickers masterfully who wanted to take her for a ride and show her a fake grave plot as the spot where Hitler's grave is supposed to be. At the police station she encounters similarities between all establishments on Earth where the police distrust her and set out a detective to watch every move she makes from this point on.

The detective "Karlsson" who is commissioned to watch after everything she does from her second day of her arrival in the city is always on her tails until he finally is the witness to a most moving final moments between Atossa and Lars in the last scene of the film. This is also the scene were we find out the hilariously surprising nature about the second promise.

Cast
 Taeis Farzan
 Marina Welsch
 Pierre Kiwitt
 Vadim Glowna
 Helgi Bjornsson
 Daryush Shokof

Political activism 
Daryush Shokof made it public in an open-letter to the world press and film festivals that he refused to submit Hitler's Grave to the 60th Berlin International Film Festival, 2010, in protest to the festival selecting again an Iranian film (this time even an Iranian-German, Co-Production for a film by Asghar Farhadi) with which he believes the festival openly insults and undermines the struggle of Iranians for freedom from under the Dictatorial rules of Islamic Republic of Iran. The film was rejected by Cannes Film Festival where other Iran-France co-production movies by Abbas Kiarostami and Asghar Farhadi who Shokof suggests are amongst the Regime,s puppet film directors are selected repeatedly in the competition sections of world festival and finally even granted an Academy Award for Farhadi whose film in his opinion lacks even script maturity. Daryush Shokof condemns all festivals that have so vividly ignored the struggle of Iranians for freedom from under the Islamic Republic rule over Iran which he refers to as being one of the most darkest and backwards and inhumane regimes to have ever governed Iran for over 30 years. During an interview with the German TV channel ARD and with the respected journalist Henryk Broder Shokof compared the Iranian regime and its dangers to be worse than the Adolf Hitler with the reasoning that today we have global Internet systems and the world is connected and watching every move everyone makes. Today no one can hide from the truth and say: we did not know.

The most controversial film from an Iranian in Recent memory and About the Iranian Peoples true struggle for Freedom, the questioning of their Faith and the Frequent protests is An Art work/Film made to show a way that exists beyond the riots and without he hatred against other people. Inspired by his own friendships and freedoms from Growing up in America, And his fathers unjustifiable imprisonment in 2009 Shaheen and Daryush Shokof made a film for the protestors as a sign to the world for what they want, what they are, and so they have a voice but also for them to think about and wonder what Freedom can be artistically. It is one of his proudest works that still has reason to give to those who seek freedom of religion, LOVE, and life in Iran and elsewhere.

Production
The film was produced by Daryush Shokof, Shahin Shokoofandeh, Taies Farzan and Vadim Glowna in Berlin, Germany.

Awards
Shokof refused to send the film to Berlin Film Festival in a protest against festival's politics which he believes continuously celebrated and still blindfully admits films from Iran each year and for many years. Shokof believes all films from Iran are Regime sponsored productions and thus he protested against electing films from Iran by any festivals world wide repeatedly for many years.
However and in the same year he sent the film to the Cannes film festival which it was rejected as well. Thereafter, he sent the film to NYIIVF where it was screened successfully and won all the awards it could win.
Hitler's Grave won the best film, best director for Shokof, best script by Shokof, best actress for Taies Farzan in the lead role at the New York International Film and Video Festival NYIIFVF in 2011.NYIIFVF further submitted the film for the academy awards considerations the same year where the film did not succeed in any categories.

See also
2009–10 Iranian election protests

Release
 ARRI Group Germany is now the world sales agent for the film from September 2011.

References

External links
 
 FACHTE: Film Trailer
 

2010 films
Iranian drama films
Films directed by Daryush Shokof